Never Laughs Mountain is located in the Lewis Range, Glacier National Park in the U.S. state of Montana. The mountain is likely named for the Blackfeet “Kat-aiyimi”, wording for never laughs, also the band of the Piegan Blackfeet. Never Laughs Mountain is easily seen to the south of Two Medicine Lake and is  NW of Mount Ellsworth.

See also
 Mountains and mountain ranges of Glacier National Park (U.S.)

References

Mountains of Glacier County, Montana
Mountains of Glacier National Park (U.S.)
Lewis Range